The following is a list of deaths in March 2009.

Entries for each day are listed alphabetically by surname. A typical entry lists information in the following sequence:
 Name, age, country of citizenship at birth, subsequent country of citizenship (if applicable), reason for notability, cause of death (if known), and reference.

March 2009

1
Robert Haggiag, 95, Libyan-born American film producer (Candy).
Ken Henry, 80, American Olympic gold medal-winning (1952) speed skater.
Charles S. Lieber, 78, Belgian-born American nutritionist, stomach cancer.
Paolo Maffei, 83, Italian astronomer and science fiction writer.
Alf Pike, 91, Canadian ice hockey player and head coach (New York Rangers).
Pepe Rubianes, 61, Spanish Catalan actor and theatre director, lung cancer.
Eric Simms, 87, British ornithologist, writer and conservationist.
Joan Turner, 86, British actress.

2
Ernest Ashworth, 80, American country music singer, member of Grand Ole Opry.
Michael Baker, 52, Canadian politician, member of the Nova Scotia House of Assembly since 1998, cancer.
Halit Balamir, c. 87, Turkish Olympic silver medal-winning (1948) wrestler, myocardial infarction.
Ernst Benda, 84, German politician, Interior Minister (1968–1969) and President, Federal Constitutional Court (1971–1983).
Andy Bowman, 74, Scottish footballer (Hearts, Newport County), after long illness.
Robert Bruce, 65, British-born New Zealand professional wrestler and talent agent, after short illness.
Chris Finnegan, 64, British boxer, Olympic middleweight champion (1968), complications from pneumonia.
Alexandre Léontieff, 60, French politician, President of French Polynesia (1987–1991), heart attack.
Ann Marie Rogers, 57, British activist, campaigner for breast cancer drug Herceptin, breast cancer.
Jacob T. Schwartz, 79, American mathematician and computer scientist, liver cancer.
Urban Sea, 20, French racehorse and broodmare, Prix de l'Arc de Triomphe winner (1993), complications during foaling.
João Bernardo Vieira, 69, Guinea-Bissauan politician, Prime Minister (1978–1980) and President (1980–1999, since 2005), shot.

3
Sydney Chaplin, 82, American actor.
Frederick Conyngham, 7th Marquess Conyngham, 84, Irish nobleman, cancer.
Sebastian Faisst, 20, German handball player, heart failure.
Flemming Flindt, 72, Danish choreographer, after short illness.
Frank Ford, 92, American radio talk show host, stroke.
Åke Lindman, 81, Finnish actor and film director, after long illness.
Luis Mena Arroyo, 88, Mexican prelate, Auxiliary Bishop of Mexico.
Gilbert Parent, 73, Canadian politician, Speaker (1994–2001) and Member of Parliament (1974–1984, 1988–2000), colon cancer.
Barbara Wright, 93, British translator.

4
Joseph Bloch, 91, American pianist and professor, heart attack.
John Cephas, 78, American Piedmont blues guitarist, natural causes.
Yvon Cormier, 70, Canadian professional wrestler, bone marrow cancer.
Horton Foote, 92, American playwright and screenwriter, after short illness.
Patricia De Martelaere, 51, Belgian writer and philosopher, complications of brain tumor.
George McAfee, 90, American football player (Chicago Bears) and member of Pro Football Hall of Fame.
Harry Parkes, 89, British footballer (Aston Villa).
Vasili Postnov, 46, Tajikistani footballer.
Salvatore Samperi, 64, Italian film director.
Triztán Vindtorn, 66, Norwegian poet.

5
Mario Acuña, 68, Argentinian-born American astrophysicist, multiple myeloma.
Valeri Broshin, 46, Russian footballer, cancer.
Francis Essex, 79, British television producer.
Temima Gezari, 103, American artist, natural causes.
Thomas T. Goldsmith, Jr., 99, American engineer, pioneer of television technology, complications of hip fracture.
Janez Gradišnik, 91, Slovenian author and translator.
Mac Henderson, 101, British rugby union player (Scotland) and businessman.
Jitsuo Inagaki, 80, Japanese politician, illness.
Oscar Kamau Kingara, 38, Kenyan lawyer and human rights activist, shot.
Hung-Chang Lin, 89, Chinese-born American inventor, lung cancer.
John Paul Oulu, Kenyan human rights activist, shot.
Dave Pureifory, 59, American football player (Detroit Lions), prostate cancer.

6
Jim Bellows, 86, American newspaper editor, Alzheimer's disease.
Silvio Cesare Bonicelli, 76, Italian Bishop of Parma.
James Clyde, Baron Clyde, 77, British judge, Lord of Appeal in Ordinary (1996–2001), cancer.
Anthony Finigan, 83, British actor.
Colleen Howe, 76, American sports agent, wife of Gordie Howe, Pick's disease.
George Keverian, 77, American politician, member (1967–1991) and Speaker (1985–1991) of the Massachusetts House.
Francis Magalona, 44, Filipino actor and rapper, leukemia.
Kennedy McIntosh, 60, American basketball player, stroke.
Vivian Murray, 76, Irish businessman, chairman of An Post and Bord Iascaigh Mhara, after long illness.
Henri Pousseur, 79, Belgian composer.
Eduardo Rodríguez, 57, Puerto Rican baseball player, septic shock.
Christon Tembo, 65, Zambian politician, Vice President (1997–2001).
Susan Tsvangirai, 50, Zimbabwean wife of Prime Minister Morgan Tsvangirai, car collision.

7
Steve Bernard, 61, American businessman, founder of Cape Cod Potato Chips, pancreatic cancer.
Michael Bowen, 71, American artist, complications of poliomyelitis.
Jimmy Boyd, 70, American actor and singer ("I Saw Mommy Kissing Santa Claus"), cancer.
Daniel E. Button, 91, American politician, member of the House of Representatives for New York (1967–1971), after long illness.
Chan Yun, 93, Taiwanese Buddhist monk and teacher of meditation.
Schuyler Chapin, 86, American general manager of the Metropolitan Opera (1972–1975).
David Gaiman, 75, British businessman, public relations director for the Church of Scientology, heart attack.
Jang Ja-yeon, 26, South Korean actress (Boys Over Flowers), suicide by hanging.
Dmitri Kozlov, 89, Russian aerospace engineer, founder of Progress State Research and Production Space Center.
Barbara Parker, 62, American novelist, after long illness.
Tullio Pinelli, 100, Italian screenwriter (La strada).
Anton Shokh, 49, Ukrainian football player and coach.

8
Girdhari Lal Bhargava, 73, Indian politician, heart attack.
Ali Bongo, 79, Indian-born British magician, pneumonia.
James Allen Keast, 86, Australian ornithologist.
Willie King, 65, American blues musician, heart attack.
Hank Locklin, 91, American country music singer, member of Grand Ole Opry.
Anna Manahan, 84, Irish actress, multiple organ failure.
Zbigniew Religa, 70, Polish cardiac surgeon and politician, Minister of Health (2005–2007), cancer.
Robert Soost, 88, American botanist, heart attack.
Ernest Trova, 82, American artist, heart failure.
Mary Warburg, 100, American philanthropist.

9
Timothy Abell, 78, English cricketer and field hockey player.
Adiele Afigbo, 71, Nigerian historian.
Hanne Darboven, 68, German artist, lymphoma.
Eddie Lowe, 83, British footballer and manager.
Joseph Martin, 84, American Roman Catholic priest, addiction counselor and author, heart disease.
Larry Regan, 78, Canadian ice hockey player and general manager (Los Angeles Kings), Parkinson's disease.
Russell Spears, 92, American stonemason, elder of the Narragansett tribe.
Frank Stockwell, 80, Irish footballer.
Guillermo Thorndike, 69, Peruvian journalist, writer and editor, co-founder of La República, heart attack.

10
Brian Barry, 73, British philosopher.
Denis Begbie, 94, South African cricketer.
Derek Benfield, 82, British actor.
Jack Capper, 77, British footballer.
Dick Daugherty, 79, American football player (Los Angeles Rams).
Nancy Eiesland, 44, American theologian and author, lung cancer.
Jack Grimes, 82, American actor and voice actor (Speed Racer).
Aaron Gural, 91, American real estate executive, pneumonia.
Tom Hanson, 41, Canadian photojournalist, heart attack.
George Hedges, 57, American lawyer and archaeologist, melanoma.
Ralph Mercado, 67, American music promoter (RMM Records & Video), cancer.
Anel Omar Rodríguez, 47, Panamanian politician, Minister of Culture, shot.
Michael Shannon, 55, American pediatrician.

11
Paul W. Airey, 85, American Chief Master Sergeant of the Air Force (1967–1969), complications from heart failure.
Péter Bacsó, 81, Hungarian film director, after long illness.
Frances Blaisdell, 97, American flautist.
Arthur Code, 85, American astronomer, complications of lung condition.
Charles Lewis, Jr., 45, American businessman, co-founder of mixed martial arts apparel company Tapout, car accident.
Grady Lewis, 92, American basketball player, executive with Converse.
Harvey Lowe, 90, Canadian broadcaster and yo-yo world champion, after long illness.

12
Leonore Annenberg, 91, American philanthropist, Chief of Protocol of the United States (1981–1982), natural causes.
Kalman Bloch, 95, American clarinetist.
Yann Brekilien, 88, French author, Breton language advocate.
Jesús Elizondo, 78, Mexican Olympic shooter.
Martin Knowlton, 88, American adult education innovator, founder of Elderhostel.
Reginald C. Lindsay, 63, American jurist, member of the District Court for Massachusetts since 1993, after long illness.
Milan Stitt, 68, American playwright.
Ferenc Szabó, 88, Hungarian footballer (Ferencvárosi TC).
Huw Thomas, 81, Welsh broadcaster.
Blanca Varela, 82, Peruvian poet.
David Wood, 86, British Army officer, last surviving platoon commander of the Pegasus Bridge operation during World War II.

13
Medferiashwork Abebe, 84, Ethiopian royal.
Claude Black, 92, American civil rights advocate, after long illness.
Betsy Blair, 85, American actress (Marty), cancer.
Claude Brinegar, 82, American politician, United States Secretary of Transportation (1973–1975), natural causes.
Anne Brown, 96, American-born Norwegian opera singer.
William Davidson, 86, American businessman, owner of the Detroit Pistons, Tampa Bay Lightning.
Endal, 13, British service dog, stroke.
Keith Herber, 60, American role-playing game designer.
Alan W. Livingston, 91, American music executive, President of Capitol Records, creator of Bozo the clown.
James Purdy, 94, American novelist, poet and playwright.
Medet Sadyrkulov, 55, Kyrgyz politician, car crash.
Andrew Saunders, 77, British civil servant.
Test, 33, Canadian professional wrestler, accidental overdose.

14
Alain Bashung, 61, French singer, composer and actor, lung cancer.
Edith Lucie Bongo, 45, Congolese wife of Gabon President Omar Bongo, after long illness.
Altovise Davis, 65, American actress and dancer, widow of Sammy Davis, Jr., stroke.
Terence Edmond, 69, British actor (Z-Cars), bronchiectasis.
Ronald Max Hartwell, 88, Australian economic historian.
Citizen Kafka, 61, American broadcaster and musician.
Millard Kaufman, 92, American screenwriter (Bad Day at Black Rock), co-creator of Mr. Magoo.
Patrick Kinna, 95, British stenographer to Winston Churchill.
Jeff Komlo, 52, American football player, fugitive, car crash.
Robin Mukherjee, 65, Indian cricketer.
Coy Watson, Jr., 96, American silent film child actor, stomach cancer.

15
Jumadi Abdi, 26, Indonesian footballer.
Nikolai Afanasyev, 92, Russian firearms designer.
Richard Aoki, 71, American civil rights activist.
Miguel Bernad, 91, Filipino Jesuit priest, academician and writer.
Billy C. Clark, 80, American writer.
Edmund Hockridge, 89, Canadian singer and actor.
Pirkle Jones, 95, American photojournalist.
Paulo Eduardo Andrade Ponte, 77, Brazilian Roman Catholic prelate, Archbishop of São Luís do Maranhão.
Michael Quinn, 86, American Lasallian brother and psychology professor, President of Saint Mary's College (1962–1969).
William Schwartz, 86, American nephrologist.
Ron Silver, 62, American actor (Ali, Timecop) and political activist, esophageal cancer.
Alan Suddick, 64, British footballer, cancer.
Shinkichi Tajiri, 85, American-born Dutch sculptor.
Gunnar Tjörnebo, 81, Swedish steeplechase athlete.
Elmer Weingartner, 90, American baseball player.
Harry Zachariah, 97, Australian cricketer.
Lionel Ziprin, 84, American poet, chronic obstructive pulmonary disease.

16
Bill Burns, 75, Australian politician.
Roland Dantes, 67, Filipino film actor and martial arts instructor, heart failure.
Carolyn Dezurik, 90, American country musician.
Franz Feldinger, 80, Austrian Olympic footballer.
Marjorie Grene, 98, American philosopher, after short illness.
Sir Nicholas Henderson, 89, British diplomat.
Nicholas Hughes, 47, American marine biologist, son of Sylvia Plath and Ted Hughes, suicide by hanging.
Jack Lawrence, 96, American songwriter, complications from fall.
Miljenko Licul, 62, Slovenian graphic designer.
Ramón Mantilla Duarte, 83, Colombian Bishop of Ipiales (1985–1987).
Popcorn Sutton, 62, American moonshiner, suspected suicide by carbon monoxide poisoning.

17
Lester Davenport, 77, American blues musician, prostate cancer.
Edith Hahn Beer, 95, Austrian author, Holocaust survivor, natural causes.
Clodovil Hernandes, 71, Brazilian fashion stylist, politician and television presenter, stroke.
Morton Lachman, 90, American television writer and executive producer, complications from diabetes and heart attack.
Whitey Lockman, 82, American baseball player (San Francisco Giants), pulmonary complications.
Jane Mayhall, 90, American poet.
Dale Memmelaar, 72, American football player (Cleveland Browns)
Roi Wilson, 87, British Royal Navy officer.

18
Eddie Bo, 79, American singer and pianist, heart attack.
Ed Callahan, 79, American credit union administrator, blood complications.
Gianni Giansanti, 52, Italian photographer, bone cancer.
Des Healey, 81, Australian rules footballer.
Kent Henry, 59, American guitarist.
Lil E. Tee, 20, American racehorse, Kentucky Derby winner (1992), euthanized.
Yeremey Parnov, 73, Russian writer.
Moultrie Patten, 89, American actor (Northern Exposure) and jazz musician, pneumonia,
Pocholo Ramirez, 76, Filipino race car driver and television host, cancer.
Natasha Richardson, 45, British actress (Cabaret, The Parent Trap, Maid in Manhattan), epidural hematoma.
Luis Rojas Mena, 91, Mexican Roman Catholic prelate, Bishop of Culiacán (1969–1993).
Glenn Sundby, 87, American gymnast, co-founder of USA Gymnastics, founder of International Gymnastics Hall of Fame.
Donald Tolmie, 85, Canadian politician, MP for Welland (1965–1972).
Earl Wood, 97, American physiologist, co-inventor of the G-suit.

19
Felipe Benítez Avalos, 82, Paraguayan archbishop of Asunción.
Maria Bergson, 95, American architect and designer.
Alastair Boyd, 7th Baron Kilmarnock, 81, British aristocrat, writer and politician.
Ion Dolănescu, 65, Romanian singer and politician, heart attack.
Ezio Flagello, 78, American opera singer, heart failure.
Harry Harris, 86, American television director (Fame, Falcon Crest), myelodysplasia.

20
Joseph Albright, 70, American jurist, member of the West Virginia Supreme Court of Appeals, esophageal cancer.
Roberta Alison, 65, American tennis player, injuries sustained in fire.
Bill Bogash, 92, American roller derby skater, respiratory failure.
Mel Brown, 69, American blues guitarist, emphysema.
Abdellatif Filali, 81, Moroccan politician, Prime Minister (1994–1998).
Vicente Gandía, 84, Mexican artist of Spanish origin, heart attack.
Jaroslav Pitner, 83, Czech ice hockey coach.
Vladimir Savčić, 60, Serbian singer, cancer.
Pierre Skawinski, 96, French Olympic sprinter.
George Weber, 47, American radio broadcaster, stabbed.
Václav Winter, 84, Czech Olympic athlete.
Albina Yelkina, 76, Soviet Olympic athlete.

21
Bob Arbogast, 81, American radio and television personality, lung cancer.
Beach Towel, 22, American harness racehorse, Harness Horse of the Year (1990), colic.
John Cater, 77, British actor.
Drummond Erskine, 89, American actor (Late Show with David Letterman).
Winifred Foley, 94, British writer.
John Franklyn-Robbins, 84, British actor.
Doug Frith, 64, Canadian MP for Sudbury (1980–1988), Minister of Indian Affairs and Northern Development (1984), heart attack.
Joseph Jasgur, 89, American photographer, natural causes.
Vladimir Kuchmiy, 61, Russian newspaper chief editor (Sport Express).
Genoveva Matute, 94, Filipino writer.
Walt Poddubny, 49, Canadian ice hockey player (New York Rangers, Edmonton Oilers).
Khadijeh Saqafi, 95, Iranian widow of religious/political leader Ruhollah Khomeini, after long illness.

22
Frank Bogert, 99, American politician, Mayor of Palm Springs, California (1958–1966, 1982–1988).
Timothy Brinton, 79, British newsreader and politician, MP (1979–1987).
Awilda Carbia, 71, Puerto Rican actress, comedian, impersonator and television personality, pneumonia.
Ralph Cooperman, 81, British Olympic fencer.
Steve Doll, 48, American professional wrestler, blood clot.
Jade Goody, 27, British reality television personality, cervical cancer.
Archie Green, 91, Canadian-born American folklorist and musicologist, renal failure.
John L. Harper, 73, British biologist.
Reg Isidore, 59, Aruban drummer (Robin Trower, Peter Green), heart attack,
Howard Komives, 67, American basketball player (New York Knicks, Detroit Pistons), natural causes.
Guman Mal Lodha, 83, Indian judge and politician.
Aubrey Mayhew, 81, American music producer.
Abismo Negro, 37, Mexican lucha libre professional wrestler, drowned.
Kanta Rao, 85, Indian actor, liver cancer.
Geoffrey Sherman, 93, British Royal Marines officer, organised the ceremony for the Japanese surrender in 1945.
Aldo Vagnozzi, 83, American politician, member of the Michigan House of Representatives (2002–2006), cancer.
Leon Walker, 20, British rugby league player, natural causes (Wakefield Trinity Wildcats).

23
Manuel del Rosario, 93, Filipino Bishop of Malolos (1962–1977), pneumonia.
Geoff Holmes, 50, British cricketer.
Raúl Macías, 74, Mexican former NBA (now WBA) world bantamweight champion boxer, cancer.
Xavier Maniguet, 62, French intelligence agent, involved in the sinking of the Rainbow Warrior, plane crash.
Billy Rackard, 78, Irish hurler and Gaelic footballer.
Lloyd Ruby, 81, American auto racing driver.
Ronald Tavel, 72, American playwright, heart attack.
Tonda, 50, American Sumatran-born orangutan, oldest in captivity in United States.
Peter Wherrett, 72, Australian motoring journalist, cancer.

24
Robert Delford Brown, 78, American artist, drowned (body found on this date).
Irina Gabashvili, 48, Georgian-born American gymnast, cancer.
Uriel Jones, 74, American drummer (The Funk Brothers), complications from heart attack.
George Kell, 86, American baseball player (Detroit Tigers) and broadcaster, member of the Baseball Hall of Fame.
Hans Klenk, 89, German racing driver.
Denis Miller, 90, New Zealand airline and bomber pilot.
Gábor Ocskay, 33, Hungarian ice hockey player, heart attack.
Laurie Short, 93, Australian trade union leader.
Igor Stelnov, 46, Russian ice hockey player (HC CSKA Moscow), 1986 world champions team member, after long illness.

25
Frank Adams, 76, British footballer.
Steven Bach, 70, American film producer and author, cancer.
Johnny Blanchard, 76, American baseball player (New York Yankees), heart attack.
Marilyn Borden, 76, American actress (I Love Lucy), heart failure.
Bob Boucher, 68, British academic.
Donald W. Duncan, 79, American soldier and antiwar activist.
Yukio Endō, 72, Japanese gymnast, esophageal cancer.
John Hope Franklin, 94, American historian, Presidential Medal of Freedom recipient, heart failure.
Mari Kapi, 58, Papua New Guinean judge, Chief Justice of the Supreme Court (2003–2008), kidney failure.
Kosuke Koyama, 79, Japanese-born American theologian, pneumonia.
Manny Oquendo, 78, American percussionist (Tito Puente, Tito Rodríguez), heart attack.
Giovanni Parisi, 41, Italian Olympic featherweight champion boxer (1988), car accident.
Arthur Richman, 83, American baseball executive (New York Yankees, New York Mets) and writer (New York Daily Mirror).
Dan Seals, 61, American country music singer-songwriter (England Dan & John Ford Coley), mantle cell lymphoma.
Michael Ward, 77, British politician, MP for Peterborough (1974–1979).
Muhsin Yazıcıoğlu, 54, Turkish politician, founder of the Great Union Party, helicopter crash.

26
Griselda Álvarez, 95, Mexican politician and writer, Governor of Colima (1979–1985), natural causes.
Arne Bendiksen, 82, Norwegian singer, composer and record producer, heart failure.
Kim Bradley, 53, Australian surfer.
Gus Cifelli, 84, American football player (Detroit Lions), natural causes.
Larry Glick, 87, American talk radio host (WBZ), complications from cardiac surgery.
Edmund Lawson, 60, British barrister, stroke.
Wayne Lewellen, 65, American film studio executive (Paramount), cancer.
John Mayhew, 61, British drummer (Genesis), heart failure.
Shane McConkey, 39, Canadian extreme skier, base jumping accident.
Bob Scott, 70, British conservationist and ornithologist, cancer.
Ivan Wyatt, 85, New Zealand cricketer.

27
Alysheba, 25, American racehorse, Kentucky Derby and Preakness winner (1987), euthanized.
Sandra Cantu, 8, American homicide victim.
Jack Dreyfus, 95, American financier, pioneer of mutual funds.
Evert Grift, 86, Dutch Olympic cyclist.
Merle Hansen, 89, American civil rights activist, founding president of the North American Farm Alliance.
Dorothy Kelly, 79, American educator, President of the College of New Rochelle, heart attack.
Irving R. Levine, 86, American journalist (NBC news), prostate cancer.
Arnold Meri, 89, Estonian Red Army World War II veteran.
Penor Rinpoche, 77, Tibetan religious leader (Nyingma Buddhist tradition).

28
Earle Brucker, Jr., 83, American baseball player.
Peter F. Donnelly, 70, American arts patron, vice-chairman of Americans for the Arts, complications of pancreatic cancer.
Inger Lise Gjørv, 70, Norwegian politician, cancer.
Janet Jagan, 88, American-born Guyanese President (1997–1999), abdominal aortic aneurysm.
Hugh Kelly, 85, British footballer (Blackpool), pneumonia.
Martin J. Klein, 84, American historian and physicist.
Helmut Noller, 89, German Olympic sprint canoer.
Jorge Preloran, 76, Argentine filmmaker, prostate cancer.

29
Ivor Dent, 85, Canadian Mayor of Edmonton (1968–1974), Alzheimer's disease.
Helvecia Viera, 80, Chilean comedian and actress, stroke.
Vladimir Fedotov, 66, Russian footballer and manager, Soviet Top League leading goalscorer (1964).
Monte Hale, 89, American country musician and actor, after long illness.
Andy Hallett, 33, American actor (Angel), heart disease.
Maurice Jarre, 84, French Academy Award-winning film composer (Lawrence of Arabia, Doctor Zhivago, Ghost), cancer.
Helen Levitt, 95, American photographer, respiratory failure.
Miroslav Moravec, 70, Czech actor, cancer.
Earl Paulk, 81, American pastor, implicated in several sex scandals, cancer.
Lou Saban, 87, American football player (Cleveland Browns) and coach (Boston Patriots, Buffalo Bills), complications from fall.
Kanwaljit Singh, 67, Indian politician, traffic accident.
Gerrit Viljoen, 82, South African politician, Administrator-General of South-West Africa (1978–1980).

30
Shirl Bernheim, 87, American actress.
Burton Blumert, 80, American president of the Center for Libertarian Studies, chairman of Mises Institute, cancer.
Eugène Drenthe, 83, Surinamese playwright and poet.
Herman Franks, 95, American baseball manager, heart failure.
Andrea Mead Lawrence, 76, American alpine skier, cancer.
Eric Munoz, 61, American politician, member of the New Jersey General Assembly since 2001, complications of cardiac surgery.
Jackie Pretorius, 74, South African racing driver, assault during home invasion.
David Scott, 92, American art historian.
George Stoddard, 92, American financier, natural causes.
Loras Joseph Watters, 93, American Roman Catholic prelate, Bishop of Winona (1969–1986).
Sulim Yamadayev, 35, Russian military commander and Chechen warlord, shot.

31
Raúl Alfonsín, 82, Argentine President (1983–1989), lung cancer.
Jarl Alfredius, 66, Swedish journalist, prostate cancer.
John Atkins, 92, British writer.
Marga Barbu, 80, Romanian actress.
Michael Cox, 60, British novelist, cancer.
Paul E. Davis, 87, American college football coach.
Emory Elliott, 66, American academic, heart attack.
A. F. Golam Osmani, 76, Indian politician, lung cancer.
Hong Song-nam, 79, North Korean politician, Premier (1997–2003).
Gordon Kerr, 91, Canadian Olympic swimmer.
Choor Singh, 98, Singaporean jurist, member of the Supreme Court of Singapore (1963–1980).
Sir Reresby Sitwell, 81, British aristocrat and writer.

References

2009-03
 03